

The Dornier Do 132 was a utility helicopter under development in Germany in the late 1960s. While the design was a conventional pod-and-boom layout, the propulsion system was unusual in that it used a turbine engine, not to drive the rotor directly, but to provide a source of hot gas that was fed through the rotor shaft, along the blades, and out through tip jets. The intention was to eliminate the weight and mechanical complexity of a gearbox and an anti-torque system for the tail.

This engine system underwent extensive static tests while a full-size mockup was built to prove the aerodynamics in a wind tunnel. Ultimately, however, the programme was cancelled in 1969 before a prototype was actually constructed.

Specifications (as designed)

References

EADS website

1960s German civil utility aircraft
Do 132
1960s German helicopters
Single-turbine helicopters